George Bush High School is a public high school located in the Mission Bend census designated place and in unincorporated Fort Bend County, Texas, serving students in grades 9-12. The school has a "Richmond, Texas" postal address but is not in the Richmond city limits. The school is part of the Fort Bend Independent School District and serves several areas of unincorporated Fort Bend County, including Mission Bend. The high school is named after the forty-first president of the United States, George H. W. Bush, who attended the school's inauguration. The school colors are orange, white, and navy blue. The average annual enrollment is approximately 2,200 students.

George Bush High School was established in 2001 in order to help educate the increasing population of Richmond, Texas. George Bush is a member of the University Interscholastic League and offers a variety of sports programs. Athletic teams compete in the 5A division and are known as the "Bush Broncos". Extracurricular activities are also offered in the form of performing arts, school publications, and clubs. Notable alumni of the school include NFL lineman Russell Okung and Emmanuel Ogbah, and NBA player Kelly Oubre Jr.

The school's campus borders the Fort Bend County/Harris County line.

History
George Bush High School was established on August 16, 2001 in order to help educate the increasing population of Richmond, TX. There was no senior class in the inaugural year. The sophomore and junior class consisted of students from Kempner High School and Austin High School.

Bush was FBISD’s Eighth Comprehensive High School.

Academics
George Bush High School operates on a 7:30 a.m. to 2:45 p.m. schedule, which includes two lunch periods. Class scheduling is organized into seven classes which students attend every day.

Extracurricular activities
The Broncos are members of the University Interscholastic League and are classified as a 5A school, the second largest classification in Texas. Throughout its history, George Bush has won one state championship, boys' basketball in 2010. Several graduates have gone on to have successful collegiate and professional athletic careers, most notably NFL lineman Russell Okung and MLB infielder Anthony Rendon, both of whom were drafted sixth overall in their respective leagues.

Athletics

Boys' Basketball
In 2010, the boys' basketball team advanced to state tournament for the first time in the school's history. The team went through the playoffs undefeated and eventually won the state championship with a 65-58 win over Lakeview Centennial High School, marking the first athletic state championship in the school's history.

Non-athletic Programs

Jazz Band
The George Bush High School Jazz Band was created in the 2009-2010 school year, directed by Larry Allen. The jazz band is an after school only program, with no class, or funding. The jazz band recently went to the TMEA UIL Solo and Ensemble on February 19. 2010 and received a I rating on their song Groove Maker by Jeff Taylor.

9th Grade Academy
Academic Decathlon
Art Club
Band
Chess Club
Choir
Color Guard
Criminal Justice Club
DECA
Esports/Gaming Club
FBLA
Fellowship of Christian Athletes
Future Farmers of America
Filipino American Student Organization
French Club
History Club
Illusions Dance Team
Math Club
Mu Alpha Theta
National Art Honor Society
National Honor Society
National English Honor Society
NJROTC
Orchestra
PALS
Pan American Students Forum
Science Club
Spanish Club
Students Council
Technology Student Association
Bush Theatrical Ensemble
Tri-M Music Honor Society
Youth Expanding Service

Feeder patterns
The following elementary schools feed into Bush:
 Mission Bend
 Arizona Fleming (partial)
 Holley
 Jordan 
 Mission Glen
 Mission West
 Seguin
 Patterson (partial)
The following middle schools feed into Bush:
 Crockett
 Hodges Bend
 Garcia (partial)

Notable alumni
Ola Adeniyi, NFL player for Pittsburgh Steelers
Josh Jones, NFL player for the Arizona Cardinals
Emmanuel Ogbah, NFL player for Miami Dolphins
Chamberlain Oguchi, Olympic basketball team member for Nigeria
Russell Okung, NFL player for Carolina Panthers and businessman, 6th overall pick in 2010 NFL Draft
Kelly Oubre Jr., NBA player for Charlotte Hornets
Anthony Rendon, MLB player for Los Angeles Angels

References

External links

 Bush High School
 
 School Profile

Educational institutions established in 2001
2001 establishments in Texas
Fort Bend Independent School District high schools